Marie-Josèphe Bonnet (born 1949 in Deauville) is a French specialist in the history of women, history of art, and history of lesbians. She has also published books in the history of the French resistance and occupation.

Biography

Academic career
Bonnet obtained a BA in history at the Pantheon-Sorbonne University, and went on to get her Master and PhD from Paris Diderot University. Working with Michelle Perrot she published her thesis, Romantic Relations between women of the 16th and 20th centuries, in 1995.

As a doctor of history, Bonnet has taught art history at Columbia University and Carleton University (in Paris), and hosted several radio and television programs for France Culture France Inter, and France 2. As an art historian, Bonnet has written several books and various articles, participating in conferences about the theme of art, women artists, and the representation of women in art. Bonnet has never had a permanent academic position in France, despite being one of the first professionally trained historians working in LGBT history.

Associations
In 1971, Bonnet was a member of the Women's Liberation Movement, and a founding member of both the Front homosexuel d'action révolutionnaire and the Gouines rouges.

In 1974, she joined La Spirale founded by the artist , and later helped found the Charlotte Calmis Association.

Bonnet is a member of the Société des gens de lettres, and the current president of the Lire à Pont-L'Evêque.

She opposes surrogacy, and is a member of the Collectif pour le respect de la personne.

Bonnet was instrumental in the rediscovery of the French Resistance work by Éveline Garnier and Andrée Jacob, which led to two pathways being named in their honour in 2019.

Selected works
 Un choix sans équivoque, Paris, Denoël-Gonthier, 1981.
 Les Relations amoureuses entre les femmes du XVI au XX (reissued in a pocket edition by Les Éditions Odile Jacob in 2001).
 Les Deux Amies: essai sur le couple de femmes dans l'art, Paris, éditions Blanche, 2000. 
 Qu'est-ce qu'une femme désire quand elle désire une femme?, Odile Jacob, 2004. 
 Les Femmes dans l'art, éditions de La Martinière Groupe, 2004. 
 Les Femmes artistes dans les avant-gardes, Odile Jacob, 2006. 
 Les voix de la Normandie combattante - Été 1944, Éditions Ouest-France, 2010. .
 Violette Morris, histoire d'une scandaleuse, Perrin, 2011. 
 Histoire de l'émancipation des femmes, Éditions Ouest-France, 2012. 
 Liberté égalité exclusion, Femmes peintres en révolution 1770-1804, Ed. Vendémiaire, 2012. 
 Tortionnaires, truands et collabos. La bande de la rue de la Pompe 1944, Ed. Ouest-France, 2013. 
 Adieu les rebelles!, Édition Flammarion- Café Voltaire, 2014.  
 Plus forte que la mort. L'amitié féminine dans les camps. Ed. Ouest-France 2015.
 Simone de Beauvoir et les femmes, Ed. Albin Michel.  
 Un réseau normand sacrifié, Manipulations anglaises sur un groupe de résistants infiltré par les Allemands, Ed. Ouest-France, 2016,

References

1949 births
Lesbian feminists
Living people
Women's historians
Paris Diderot University alumni
Pantheon-Sorbonne University alumni
Historians of LGBT topics
20th-century French historians
French feminist writers
French women historians
Radical feminists
21st-century French historians